Hong Jeong-nam (born 21 May 1988) is a South Korean professional footballer who plays as a goalkeeper. His younger brother Hong Jeong-ho, is also a footballer.

Club career

Madura United
On 13 January 2022, He signed a one-year contract with Indonesian Liga 1 club Madura United. He made his league debut for Madura United on 28 January 2022 in a win 2–1 against PSIS Semarang.

Honours

Club
Jeonbuk Hyundai Motors
K League 1: 2009, 2011, 2014, 2015, 2017, 2018, 2019, 2020
AFC Champions League: 2016
Sangju Sangmu
K League 2: 2013

References

External links

Hong Jeong-nam at sangjufc.co.kr

1988 births
Living people
South Korean footballers
South Korean expatriate footballers
Jeonbuk Hyundai Motors players
Gimcheon Sangmu FC players
Madura United F.C. players
K League 1 players
K League 2 players
Liga 1 (Indonesia) players
Expatriate footballers in Indonesia
South Korean expatriate sportspeople in Indonesia
Sportspeople from Jeju Province
Association football goalkeepers